Prepuštovec may refer to:

 Prepuštovec, Zagreb, a village north of Sesvete, Croatia
 Prepuštovec, Krapina-Zagorje County, a village south of Budinščina, Croatia